Clash of Clans is a 2012 free-to-play mobile strategy video game developed and published by Finnish game developer Supercell. The game was released for iOS platforms on August 2, 2012, and on Google Play for Android on October 7, 2013.

The game is set in a fantasy-themed persistent world where the player is a chief of a village. Clash of Clans tasks players to build their own village using the resources gained from attacking other player's villages with troops; earning rewards, buying them with medals or by producing them at their own village. The main resources are gold, elixir and dark elixir. Players can conjoin to create clans, groups of up to fifty people, who can then participate in Clan Wars together, donate and receive troops, and chat with each other. The minimum number of players of a Clan War is thirty. 

Clash of Clans was released to generally positive reviews from critics.

Four spin-off games in the same universe of Clash of Clans were developed by Supercell. The first, Clash Royale, was released in 2016. The other three, Clash Quest, Clash Mini, and Clash Heroes, were announced in April 2021. Clash Quest development was discontinued on 17 August 2022.

Gameplay
Clash of Clans is an online multiplayer game in which players form communities called clans, train troops, and attack other players to earn resources. There are four currencies or resources in the game. Gold and elixir can be used to build and upgrade defenses and traps that protect the player's village from other players' attacks and to build and upgrade buildings. Elixir and dark elixir are also used to upgrade troops and spells. In past, they were also used to train the troops but now training is free. Gems are the premium currency. Attacks are rated on a three-star scale and have a maximum timed length of three minutes.

The game also features a pseudo-single-player campaign in which the player can attack a series of fortified goblin villages and earn gold, elixir (and dark elixir in higher levels).

To perform an upgrade, a free builder is needed. The game starts with two builders, but the player can have up to five builders through buying them with gems and even a sixth by getting and unlocking the O.T.T.O Hut in Builder Base 9.

Buildings
To earn and store gold and elixir, players must build gold mines and gold storages and elixir collectors and elixir storages. Elixir is used to carry out research in the laboratory to upgrade troops, and to build and upgrade certain buildings, mostly pertaining to buildings used in attacking another player's base. Gold is used to build defensive buildings and to upgrade the town hall, which allows access to more buildings and higher levels for existing buildings. At Town Hall 7, dark elixir becomes available; this type of elixir is used to train and upgrade dark elixir troops, heroes such as the Barbarian King, and starting at Town Hall 8, create dark spells. To earn and store dark elixir, players must build dark elixir drills and dark elixir storages. At Town Hall 9, Archer Queen becomes available.

The Eagle Artillery is a defensive building first available at Town Hall 11. Town Hall 11 also provides access to a new hero - The Grand Warden, who requires elixir to be born and upgraded unlike the other heroes. At Town Hall 12, a defense called the Giga Tesla is installed on the Town Hall, when upgraded to Town Hall 13 the Giga Inferno replaces the Giga Tesla. Town Hall 13 also unlocks the Scattershot building and the Royal Champion hero. Town Hall 14 unlocks the Pet House, a building used to assign pets to heroes, and the ability for Builder's Huts to be upgraded to level 4, turning them into attack structures. 

Town Hall 15 unlocks 2 defenses, which are Monolith and Spell Tower. The Monolith deals a high damage per second and adds an extra damage percentage to the troop being targeted. The Spell Tower, which has 3 types of spells that you can choose as you upgrade have different powers to boost the area or against the troops. 

There are a number of buildings available to the player to defend their village, including cannons, mortars, bombs, teslas, traps, archer towers, wizard towers, inferno towers, eagle artilleries,
scattershots, Monolith, and Spell Tower. Players can also build walls, which can be upgraded further as a player's town hall level increases.

Troops and spells
The game has two kinds of barracks (barracks and dark barracks) and two kinds of spell factories (spell factory and dark spell factory). Initially, the barracks were used to train troops using elixir, whereas dark barracks trained troops using dark elixir. However, the July 2022 update made all troops free to train, with the primary limitation being space in the army camps. Both sets of barracks can be upgraded to higher levels to unlock more troops (fifteen total troops for the barracks, and eight for the dark barracks, each with unique strengths, weaknesses, and strategies).

The spell factories follow the same pattern - the normal spell factory creates spells using elixir, and the dark spell factory using dark elixir. All troops and spells have different properties. In addition, the dark spell factory produces spells that require less space, allowing more of these spells to be used in a battle. As the player progresses, several new troops and spells are able to be unlocked.

At Town Hall 12, the Workshop can be built to construct seven different types of siege machines. You will only be allowed to unlock 3 siege machines at town hall 12. In order to unlock them all you must first upgrade your town hall to level 15 (the maximum level) which will allow you to upgrade the workshop to level 7. Upgrading it to level 7 will allow you to build each siege machine. Introduced in March 2020, Super Troops are troops that are more powerful troops than their original counterparts and have special abilities.

Town Hall 14 unlocks the Pet House, a building used to assign one of four pets to heroes, each serving a different role in assisting a hero.

Town Hall 15 introduces the new recall spell, 4 hero pets, the Electro Titan troop, and the battle drill siege machine. The Recall spell remove units from the attack and allows you to redeploy the troops on another position and is unlocked at Town Hall 13. The siege machine digs underground and targets defenses and stuns them for 2 seconds. The Electro Titan has an electric aura that slowly damages anything in its range, and it targets both ground and air units. The four new pets are Frosty which slows down enemies, Diggy which digs underground and stuns defenses, Poison Lizard that poisons nearby troops or defenses, and lastly Phoenix where when the Hero is knocked out it revives the Hero and gives it a temporary shield of invulnerability.

Clans and clan wars
Clans are groups of players who join to support each other, either materially (donating troops) or verbally (giving advice). Players can join clans once they rebuild the special Clan Castle building early on. A major component of the gameplay of Clash of Clans is clans facing off against one another in the "clan wars". Clan leaders and co-leaders can begin wars against other clans. Each clan is then given one "preparation day" and one "war day." When a player attacks a member of the opposing clan, they receive stars based upon the amount of destruction they cause to the opponent's base, 50% damage or more gives 1 star, destroying the townhall also gives 1 star and destroying the entire base gives the remaining third star. Each player is limited to two attacks per war and the team with the most stars at the end of the war day is declared victorious. If the two clans' number of stars are equal, then the victor is the one that has a greater percent of destruction. Players receive bonus war loot if they use their attacks in the war. This loot may be different on different bases and is decided by Supercell; the top base has the most war bonus loot and the last base has the least amount of bonus loot. If the clan wins the war, the bonus loot is fully delivered to the player but during a loss or draw one-third of the loot is delivered to the player. In the March 2016 update, 35v35 and 45v45 were removed. The available war sizes are 50v50, 40v40, 30v30, 25v25, 20v20, 15v15, 10v10, and 5v5. In the May 2016 update, Friendly Challenges were introduced to allow clanmates to compete amongst other clanmates, however these challenges do not provide loot or trophies and do not affect a player's army. In the October 2018 update, Clan War Leagues were introduced. Clans would fight seven other clans to advance to the next league and earn league medals by earning stars in Clan War Leagues. The clans in the group with the most stars will be promoted to a higher league, while the clans in the group with the least stars will be demoted to a lower league.

Builder Base

Following an update on May 22, 2017, Supercell released the new "Builder Base" game mode to the game. It allows players to sail to a new island and create a new village with a different set of buildings.

In the "Builder Base" game mode, players can attack each other's bases simultaneously. The player who deals the most damage or getting more stars can get rewards such as gold, elixir, and trophies. However, the gold and elixir can only be won for the first three victories made by the player within a twenty-four hour timeframe, but can continue attacking for trophies afterwards.

Players can spend gems to speed up the in-game time. The progress will be much faster in this base with the introduction of Clock Tower (temporarily speeds the process in the entire Builder Base) and Gem Mine. A new hero, the Battle Machine, was also introduced along with this update. It is the only hero in the game that has a reusable ability named Electric Hammer. In March 2018, Builder Hall level 8 was released while the June 2019 update brought Builder Hall 9 which is currently the highest Builder Hall level. This update also brought O.T.T.O Hut, a secondary builder that can only be unlocked by finishing a number of in game challenges. When unlocked, the master builder can be moved between the Builder Base and the Home Village.

Clan games and magic items
In December 2017, Supercell introduced Clan Games where clan members could work together to complete tasks, which would then earn clan points. When enough points are accumulated, a new reward tier unlocks, and players can select one reward from each unlocked tier. This update also introduced Magic Items, obtainable as rewards from Clan Games and through events. These items can be used e.g. to get resources, finish upgrades, or briefly add levels to troops or heroes.

Clan capital 
The Clan Capital is the central hub where the entire Clan contributes to the construction and upgrading of a massive base. Every member of a Clan will be able to contribute to building a new region to strengthen its defenses and upgrade its troops. A Clan will to try and defeat other Clans’ Capitals over the course of a Raid Weekend. Capital Gold is earned during raids to upgrade and improve the Capital but also Raid Medals that you can use to purchase items for your own Village. You can purchase reinforcement Troops without having to wait for your other Clanmates to donate.  On December 2022, decorating your own house in the Capital Peak was made possible and a clan can earn Clan Capital Leagues to promote to a higher rank and can earn exp for the clan.

Development, release, and marketing

Clash of Clans was developed by Supercell, the company behind other popular mobile games like Hay Day and Brawl Stars . The game took six months to develop with the gameplay changing little over the course of development. According to Supercell's Lasse Louhento the development team encountered no major hurdles during this time. Inspiration for the game included the games Backyard Monsters and Travian with the art style being influenced by old Super NES and arcade games. Initially the art style was more cartoon based but this was changed as the team worried it would alienate the more hardcore segment of their audience. Throughout most of development the game was multiplayer-only focused however after focus testing, Supercell went back and added a single-player mode. The game was released for iOS platforms on August 2, 2012, and on Google Play for Android on October 7, 2013.

In February 2015, Supercell released their Clash of Clans Super Bowl XLIX commercial, featuring Liam Neeson parodying his character from Taken. On February 2, Business Insider reported the ad as the fifth most watched Super Bowl ad, though on February 6, VentureBeat reported the ad was the most viewed of those that appeared on the Super Bowl. YouTube users later voted the advertisement the second best Super Bowl ad, behind Nissan's "With Dad" ad.

On September 23, 2015, Taiwanese singers JJ Lin and Jimmy Lin released the game's theme song "全面开战" ("Fight on All Fronts" in English), which was sung in Mandarin.

Reception

Critical reception 
Clash of Clans has received generally positive reviews. The iOS version holds an aggregate score of 74 out of 100 on Metacritic, and 80% on GameRankings.

Gamezebo's Leif Johnson was impressed, scoring the game 4.5 out of 5. Although he felt the gameplay was heavily skewed to encourage the player to purchase gems, he praised the addition of a single-player campaign. He concluded that "Clash of Clans is a simple game, but that's more of a strength than a weakness. It's simple enough to provide quick, painless matches on an iPhone in an idle moment, and there are enough different units to choose from in the battle mode to make playing against other players endlessly rewarding. Best of all, the option to fight against NPC goblins gives Clash of Clans a small edge over similar strategy games that rely almost entirely on player-versus-player combat."

Pocket Gamer'''s Peter Willington was equally impressed, scoring the game 9 out of 10 and giving it a "Gold Award". Reviewing the game several months after it was released for iOS devices, Willington praised the game for requiring real strategy to play. He wrote that the gameplay was built on the progression of "requiring more and more sophisticated units, asking you to strategise and really think about which elements you should focus on building within your camp." He concluded that "Clash of Clans is a superb game, freemium or otherwise, with more nuance than most give it credit for. That's why it's passed the test of time since its launch and still has an active community devotedly constructing elaborate fortresses in the hope of becoming invincible."

148App's Rob Rich scored the game 3.5 out of 5, writing "It's great to play an online freemium game that doesn't shy away from the single-player experience but also offers up some honest-to-goodness direct interaction, which is a very rare combination these days. It probably won't warm the hearts of any haters out there, but it does give genre fans something with a bit more action and strategy than they might be used to." Tom's Guide enjoyed the player interaction.

Modojo's John Bedford scored the game 3 out of 5. He was critical of freemium gaming in general, writing "The novelty hasn't just worn off this particular style of greedy gaming, it's shriveled up and condensed itself into an infinitely dense singularity of self-loathing." Of the game itself, he concluded, "This is a game that follows in the footsteps of no small number of titles that have made feverish demands on our wallets in exchange for just a slightly thicker slice of the gameplay. It's possible you have an unending appetite for these micromanagement titles, in which case we recommend getting heartily stuck into Supercell's latest game. While Clash of Clans brings something new to accompany its competent but unexceptional empire gameplay, for most of us it'll be a case of too little, too late."

Commercial receptionClash of Clans became an App Store top 5 download between December 2012 and May 2013, and this success has been described as helping to usher in a new era in single-player gaming on mobile devices.

In 2013, Clash of Clans was the third-highest game in revenue generated on the App Store and number one on Google Play.

In February 2014 it was reported that the game was generating $654,000 in daily revenue for Supercell.

In 2015, the game was the top grossing app on both the App Store and Google Play, with an estimated revenue of 1.5 million dollars per day.

It was the fourth most installed app in the App Store and the seventh most installed app in the Play Store, where it had amassed 500 million downloads by 2018.

As of 2018, Clash of Clans has generated more revenue than any other app on the App Store, having brought in a revenue of over $6.4 billion since its launch.

As of 2020, Clash of Clans remains in the top 50 grossing apps in both the Play Store and App Store, more than eight years following its release in 2012.

See also

 Game of War: Fire Age Lords Mobile Clash Royale''
 Supercell (video game company)

References

External links
 
  
 

2012 video games
Android (operating system) games
Fantasy video games
Free-to-play video games
Video games containing battle passes
IOS games
Video games developed in Finland
Supercell (video game company) games
2010s fads and trends